William Quigley (born April 29, 1961) is an American painter from Philadelphia, Pennsylvania.

Education

William Quigley graduated from the Philadelphia College of Art in 1984 with a BFA. While at Philadelphia College of Art, he also studied sculpture, painting and printmaking while abroad at the Tyler School of Art in Italy from 1982-1983. 

In 1984, Quigley enrolled at the University of Pennsylvania to study political science and art. 

From 1985 - 1987 he attended Columbia University Graduate School of Fine Arts in New York City.

Career
In June 1985, before entering Columbia, Quigley had his first show with Andy Warhol at the McNeil Gallery for the Images of a Child's World. McNeil chose three abstract Quigley works and sold them within the first hour. The show traveled from Bruno Bischhofberger Gallery in Switzerland to Philadelphia. Through Henry McNeil, one of the leading contemporary art collectors in the US, Quigley began his early career exhibiting in group shows with artists such as Julian Schnabel, Jean Michel Basquiat, Barbara Kruger, Ross Bleckner, Richard Artschwager, Keith Haring, David Salle, Don Van Vliet, Pat Steir, Dennis Oppenheim and Cindy Sherman.

Quigley painted in Venezuela in 1989.

He resided in Los Angeles from 1990 to 2004, where he met and worked with LA dealer Manny Silverman.

While participating in ARTLA Fair in December 1992-93 Quigley met art dealers Ferran and Marisa Cano, from Mallorca, Spain. They offered Quigley the opportunity to come paint for six months in Mallorca in June 1992. During this period Quigley made 44 works at the gallery and was given the chance to explore the work and studio of Joan Miró. 

After returning to Los Angeles, he opened artist run gallery Mayb which became the infamous AB Gallery in 1994, directed by Dan Bernier. The gallery was a hotbed for young artists such as George Stoll, Martin Kersels, Marc Chiat, Steve Hurd, Russell Crotty, Jason Rhoades, Manuel Ocampo, and Kevin Sullivan.

In 1998 and 1999 Quigley traveled to India and made a series of works that has had tremendous impact on his overall style and direction. 

In 1999 he set up a second studio in Soho, New York. Quigley's move to New York sparked an incredibly productive period working with a few different bands, including Pete Francis, Dispatch, and piano genius Paul Tillotson. He created albums and stages and in 2000 developed a company with Francis called "Skrapper". The t-shirt company used Quigley's Boxer paintings and other works along with quirky sayings on their products.

While in Los Angeles trying to make a living Quigley turned to film, commercials and music videos. He worked as an art director and set designer on the sets of directors such as David Fincher, Marc Chiat, Nigel Dick, David Kellogg, Phedon Papamichael, Gregory Dark and Dick George. He was involved in films such as Punch the Clock and Dark Side of Genius, and music videos such as Madonna's "Oh Father", "Express Yourself" and "Like a Prayer", Prince's "Gett Off", Paula Abdul's "Straight Up", Tom Petty's "Freefallin", and OutKast's The Art of Storytelling. 

Quigley's work has been collected by over 450 people worldwide. Portraits of influential figures as President Bill Clinton, California Governor Arnold Schwarzenegger, athletes Shaquille O'Neal, Ali and Michael Jordan, Eminem, Audrey Hepburn, Woody Allen, Chris Kyle, Christy Turlington, and Kevin Spacey are some of his most prominent works.

Works

The Boxer Series 
In 1999, downtown New York artist William Quigley was commissioned to create a "no contemporary" fighter painting for a friend. The Boxer Series is a continuing work in progress that investigates through visual study the growth, history, character and impact of the boxing fighter since its birth in the late 1800s. Consisting of confident portraits, traditional confrontational boxing poses, head to head battles, and an occasional knockdown, the subject matter subtly makes comparisons between the life of a prize fighter and one of a painter aiming for something else.

Civil War Show
This show consisted of 16 paintings, one carved sculpture of a 15-year-old black Union soldier, and a 40-page hand painted book visually illustrating an interplanetary diary of the War. As the series developed, the theme became more focused on not only the individual lives of the soldiers, generals and President Abraham Lincoln, but the fight for freedom and respect for the black culture, then considered slaves.

The Civil War Book
The Civil War Book was the fourth book made by William Quigley. Originally it was intended to be a sketch pad for ideas and information about the American Civil War, yet, it later became an elaborate complement to the Civil War Paintings and was shown at the Lawrence Gallery in 1996. The book's gritty design incorporates war documentation, random notes, photos and nostalgic battlefield tales illustrating one of the most complex and misunderstood wars in American history.

Bibliography
 Andy Warhol: at McNeil Gallery/Fledging new artist William Quigley, Philadelphia Inquirer, June 1985
 Sculptured Skywriting and Mythic Photography, Victoria Donohoe, Page C03, Philadelphia Inquirer, July 20, 1985
 New Art, Phillip Dash, Details Magazine, May 1991
 Dark Side of Genius, Filmmaker Magazine, 1993
 William Quigley: del expresimo a la tradition, Maria J.Bonafe, Ultima Hora, Mallorca, Spain, October 21, 1993
 William Quigley: at Ferran Cano, El Pais, Television Guide, Madrid, Spain, October 1993
 Trebals de Mallorca: William Quigley, Juan Gacra Sevilla, El Diario De Mallorca, October 1993
 Thin on Attitude, Susan Kandell, Los Angeles Times, February 1994
 AB Gallery Opens Moves and Changes (feature Galley Guide) New York, LA, 1994
 I want to Touch Life, Pankaj Tuli, Hindustan Times, Delhi India, October 1998
 A survey of Paintings (published in Delhi by American Artist) The Times of India, Arts section, November 1998
 Quigley Hangs in My House, Michael Allante, Vanity Fair, March 1999
 Fame Brushes, Ryan D'Agostino, New York Observer, September 2002
 How to Spend a Million Dollars, Ryan D'Agostino, MBA Jungle, October 2002
 New Light Gallery, Anne Jennings, Virginia, September 2000
 Its Time For My Closeup Mr. Quigley, Amanda Von Poggense, Zink Magazine, September 2004
 Side Dish, Joanna Molloy, NY Daily News, May 25, 2004
 Fame Brushes, Joanna Molloy, NY Daily News, June 1, 2004
 Page Six, Richard Johnson, NY Post, June 2, 2004
 Page Six, Richard Johnson, NY Post, June 15, 2004
 Now Served: a course in Restaurants Cater to Art, Joe Dziemianowicz, NY Daily News, Sept 15, 2004
 Jasper, Joanna Molloy, NY Daily News, August 10, 2004

Selected Permanent Collections
 Andy Warhol Estate, New York, NY
 Beyeler Foundation, Basel, Switzerland
 Institute of Contemporary Art, Philadelphia, PA
 Keith Haring Estate, New York, NY
 Galleria Ferran Cano Foundation, Mallorca, Spain
 Conejo Valley Museum, Santa Barbara, CA
 Douglas Cramer Collection, Santa Ynez Valley, CA
 Bradford Mill Wheelhouse, Concord, MA
 MOCA, Los Angeles, CA
 Muhammad Ali Foundation, Louisville, KY
 Philadelphia Museum of Art, Philadelphia, PA
 Scottsdale Contemporary Museum of Art, Scottsdale, AZ
 William DeKooning Estate, East Hampton, NY
 Manny Silverman Collection, Los Angeles, CA
 Beal Related, Boston, MA
 Henry McNeil Collection, Fort Washington, PA

Individual exhibitions
 2019	SCOPE MIAMI, AB Gallery NY, December 2019,  Miami, FL  
 	ART MARKET HAMPTONS, AB Gallery NY, July 3–7, Bridgehampton, NY  
 	SKRAPSTRACTIONS, AB Gallery NY, August 15-Sept 9, East Hampton, NY 
 2018	VIA EASTHAMPTON,  Skrapper Studio, July East Hampton, NY 
 	NEW PRINTS, Benefit for Concord Cancer Center, May, Chadds Ford, PA 
 	RONJO, Commission painted 1960 Ronjo Sculpture, Montauk Beach House, Montauk, NY 
 	VICE TV, Producer Director Dominic Musacchio, Mick Jagger Video, New York  
 2017  UNTITLED ABSTRACTIONS,  curated by Sam Keller, Skrapper Studio,  July, East Hampton, NY 
 	STEWARDSHIP OF THE ARTS AWARD, The Umbrella, May, Concord, MA  
 	#NO FILTER/THE BOXERS, Montauk Beach House, July, Montauk, NY 
 	VICE TV, Producer Director Dominic Musacchio, Tom Brady Video, New York 
 2016	FROM LOS ANGELES TO EAST HAMPTON AND BACK AGAIN, Karl Hutter Fine Art, April 29-May 20, Beverly Hills, CA 
 	SELECT ART FAIR, Sensei Gallery, December, Miami, FL 
 2015 	ROCK STARS AND POLITICIANS, Skrapper Studio, August, East Hampton, NY 
 2013 	THE PLEASURISTS, New Works, Skrapper Studio, July, East Hampton, NY  
 	THE PRICE CENTER hosts WILLIAM QUIGLEY, Chris Quidley Gallery, April 4-May  
 	NEW PRINTS, Artspace, The Wheelhouse/Bradford Mill, February, Concord, MA  
 2011 	I HAD IT ALL ALONG, 71 Mercer Street Gallery, March, New York, NY 
 2010  LETS DO THIS AGAIN,  71 Mercer Street Gallery, October, New York, NY 
 2008	ART MIAMI, Quigley New Abstract Works, 71 Mercer Street Gallery, Decemb 
 2007  VH1 VISUAL ARTIST OF THE YEAR, Lincoln Center, Honorees William and Hillary 
 	Roger Waters, John Sykes, Jon Bon Jovi, John Mayer, Lincoln Center, New York
 2006	NEW WORKS, Red Bull Space, Watts St. February, New York, NY 	 
 	ABC TV LIFE STYLES OF THE RICH AND FAMOUS, LIFE OF LUXURY, George Hamilton  
 	William Quigley, Madonna, Paul McCartney, Ceech Marin, Dennis Hopper. ABC TV, New York 
 2003 	AS IS, 71 Mercer Street Gallery, April, New York, NY  
 2002	IRELAND SHOW, 71 Mercer Street Gallery, Jurys Berkeley Court Hotel , October, Dublin, Ireland 
 2000	27 SKRAPPERS,  MayB Gallery, June, New York 
 1999	I ALWAYS WANTED TO GO TO IRELAND, MayB Gallery, Starett Lehigh Bldg., April, New You 
 	IRVINE MEDICAL CENTER, CANCER CENTER OF IRVINE CENTER PERMANENT COLLECTION, Irvine, CA  
 1998	SURVEY Of PAINTINGS FROM INDIA, Release of new book, Cypher Fine Art, September, Los Angeles and Delhi, India,  
 	THE INDIA DRAWINGS, Defense Colony Gallery, GK 2, Sept, Delhi, India	 
 1997	UNTITLED, collection of paintings in the home of Abdoul Sesay, March, Los Angeles, CA 
 	NEW PAINTINGS Heidi Voltafiedl Gallery, January, Basel, Switzerland 
 	MINI MALL SHOW REVISITED, AB Gallery, December, Los Angeles 
 1996	CIVIL WAR PAINTINGS, Lawrence Gallery, October, Beverly Hills	 
 	THE MINI MALL SHOW, AB Gallery, April, Hollywood, CA 
 	NEW WORKS, CANCER CENTER OF IRVINE CENTER PERMANENT COLLECTION, Irvine, CA 
 1995  NEW PAINTINGS, Ikon Fine Art, Gramercy Art Fair, Chateau Marmount, December, Los Angeles, CA 
 	THE MINI MALL SHOW, AB Gallery, Mini Mall Six, Sunset/ Highland, December, Hollywood, CA 
 1994	NEW PAINTINGS, AB Gallery, Robertson Blvd. February, Los Angeles, CA 
 1993  ART BASEL 1993, Galeria Ferran Cano, December, Basel, Switzerland 		 
 	UNIVERSITY OF PENNSYLVANIA Hospital Gallery, Dept. of Neurosurgery, Permanent Collection, Philadelphia, PA 
 	NINE WORKS  The Place, Pazzia Art House,  April,  Los Angeles,CA		 
 1992	ART BASEL 1992, Galeria Ferran Cano/ Ernst Beyeler Gallery, December, Basel, Switzerland 
 1991	WILLIAM QUIGLEY NEW PAINTINGS, Art Services, Manny Silverman Gallery, November, Los Angeles, CA 
 1990	BLACK AND BLOO, Sylvester Stallone and William Quigley,  April, Los Angeles, CA 
 	UNTITLED, Manny Silverman Gallery, July, Los Angeles, CA 
 1989	NEW QUIGLEY WORKS, Tendler/Brachman,  February, New York, NY 
 1987	NEW WORKS, Andrew Calle Gallery, November, Paris, France 
 1985	PRINTS AND DRAWINGS BY QUIGLEY,  Steward Lamlee Gallery, September, New York, NY 
 	ABSTRACTIONS/ APPROPRIATIONS, Henry McNeil Gallery, July, Philadelphia, PA 
       ANDY WARHOL/ WILLIAM QUIGLEY, Henry S. McNeil Gallery, June, Philadelphia, PA

Group exhibitions
 1984 - PHILADELPHIA COLLEGE OF ART AWARD SHOW, UNIVERSITY OF THE ARTS, June, Philadelphia
 1985 - IMAGES OF A CHILD'S WORLD, Andy Warhol, McNeil Gallery, June, Philadelphia
 APPROPRIATIONS/ABSTRACTIONS, McNeil Gallery, July, Philadelphia
 1986 - TWO GERMANS, ONE AMERICAN,Klaus Nuefert Gallery, May, Cologne, Germany
 1987 - ART FIGHTING AIDS, McNeil Gallery, May, Philadelphia
 ART AGAINST AIDS, Tendler/Brachman, June, New York
 ART FIGHTING AIDS, PORT AUTHORITY MUSEUM, June, Philadelphia
 1989 - FOURTH INTERNATIONAL CONTEMPORARY ART FAIR, Manny Silverman Gallery, December, Los Angeles  
 1990 - 100 EMERGING ARTISTS PHILADELPHIA MUSEUM OF ART, May, Philadelphia
 FIFTH INTERNATIONAL CONTEMPORARY ART FAIR William Turner Gallery, Los Angeles
 LOS ANGELES FREE CLINIC HEALTH AUCTION  June,  Los Angeles
 Gail Feingarten Gallery, Los Angeles
 Couturier Gallery,  January, Los Angeles
 1991 - Manny Silverman  Gallery, Los Angeles
 CHRISTMAS SHOW  8500 Holloway, May b Gallery, Los Angeles
 1992 - ART '23 BASEL, Galeria Ferran Cano, July, Basel, Switzerland
 Free Clinic of Los Angeles Auction, February, Los Angeles
 Metropolitan Art Gallery, May, Los Angeles
 1993 - THE NEW PIER SHOW CHICAGO INTERNATIONAL ART FAIR, Galeria Ferran Cano, May, Chicago
 "THE LIVING ROOM SHOW"  MAY b Gallery, June, Los Angeles
 COUNTDOWN TO THE NEXT MILLENIUM, LACE Gallery, April, Los Angeles
 1994 - SIXTH BIENNIAL ART AUCTION MUSEUM OF CONTEMPORARY ART June, Los Angeles
 PROJECT ANGEL FOOD, Pacific Design Center, December, Los Angeles
 LA ART FAIR, December, Los Angeles
 1995 - BUTTERFIELD & BUTTERFIELD, December Auction Project Angel Food, December, Los Angeles
 RAINFORREST, Laddie John Dill Studio, December, Venice, CA
 LAST EXIT, Soho West Gallery, January, Los Angeles
 OUT WITH THE OLDE, Jeffrey Gold Gallery, April, New York
 1996 - NEW PAINTINGS, Gramercy Art Fair, December, New York
 COLLECTION OF CHARLES CRAIG, CONEJO VALLEY MUSEUM, May, Conejo Valley, CA
 CHICAGO ART FAIR, Ferran Cano Gallery, May, Chicago 
 CHRISTMAS SHOW, Couturier Gallery, December, Los Angeles
 1998 - NAVY PIER, CHICAGO ART FAIR, Ferran Cano Gallery, May, Chicago
 2000 - NEW LIGHT GALLERY, New Light Gallery, May, Abingdon, Virginia
 2001 - NEW LIGHT GALLERY, New Light Gallery, August, Abingdon, Virginia
 2003 - JUDGEMENT DAY, PablosBirthday, December, New York
 2003 - SCOPE, Gavensvort Hotel, December, New York
 2004 - ART IS NOT UNTOUCHABLE, Pablos Birthday, April, New York
 2012 - THE WHEELHOUSE, 30 artists, April, Concord, MA
 2013 - THE PLEASURISTS, Skrapper Studio, July, East Hampton, NY
 2014 - THE PLEASURISTS, Skrapper Studio, July, East Hampton, NY
 2015 - THE PLEASURISTS, Skrapper Studio, July, East Hampton, NY
 2016 - ARTISTS AND WRITERS GAME SHOW, Skrapper Studio, 40 artists, July, East Hampton, NY
 2017 - THE PLEASURISTS, Skrapper Studio, July, East Hampton, NY
 2018 - VIA EAST HAMPTON, Skrapper Studio, July, East Hampton, NY
 2019 - MARKET ART AND DESIGN, July, Bridgehampton, NY
 2019 - GOD ALWAYS KNOWS, AB NY Gallery, August, East Hampton, NY
 2019 - TEXAS CONTEMPORARY, George R Brown Convention Center, October,Houston, TX

See also
 Jasper Johns
 Francis Picabia
Willem Dekooning
Jackson Pollock

References

External links
 Life of Luxury: George Hamilton interviews William Quigley for National TV on YouTube
 WQ Civil War Archive

20th-century American painters
American male painters
21st-century American painters
21st-century American male artists
Artists from New York (state)
American contemporary painters
Painters from Pennsylvania
University of Pennsylvania alumni
Postmodern artists
Living people
1961 births
Columbia University School of the Arts alumni
20th-century American male artists